BGR Capital & Trade, LLC is a boutique investment bank focused on sell side and buy side mergers and acquisitions, divestitures, management buyouts, leveraged buyouts, capital raising, and joint ventures.  Headquartered in Washington, D.C., BGR Capital & Trade has an office in London’s West End as well as affiliates in Europe, Asia, and the Middle East.  BGR Capital & Trade is a subsidiary of BGR Group, a Washington, DC-based lobbying firm.

Since its inception, BGR Capital & Trade has completed billions of dollars in global mergers and acquisitions, financing and restructuring deals in a broad range of industries, including technology, retail and consumer, media and telecom, business services and software, health care, manufacturing, and financial services.

Business divisions

Mergers and acquisitions
This division offers merger and acquisition advisory services.  In addition to advising  on sell side and buy side mergers and acquisitions, BGR Capital & Trade also prepares independent valuations of companies for management buyouts, leveraged buyouts, and transaction structuring.

Divestitures
Full‐scope divestiture advisory services.

Capital raising
BGR Capital & Trade is assisting in the process of raising both equity and debt capital for middle-market companies due to their close and consistent interface with private equity funds, hedge funds, and sovereign wealth funds seeking new investment opportunities. BGR Capital & Trade handles the institutional private placements of equity, senior debt, mezzanine debt and subordinated debt, including structuring, negotiating, cash flow analysis and advice on the timing of financing transactions. It offers restructuring, recapitalization and reorganization advice, as well as providing formal business valuation and research services.

Joint ventures
This division provides international deal making in strategic alliances, joint ventures, and trading relationships.

References

External links
 BGR Capital & Trade website

Banks based in Washington, D.C.
Investment banks in the United States